Catherine Doucet (born Catherine Green; June 20, 1875 – June 24, 1958) was an American actress. She appeared in more than 30 films between 1915 and 1954. Her film debut came in As Husbands Go.

Doucet's work on Broadway began with Brown of Harvard (1906) and ended with Oh, Brother! (1945).

Doucet was married to Paul Doucet, "a prominent actor of French extraction" for 14 years until his death in 1928.

Partial filmography

 From the Valley of the Missing (1915) - Mrs. Vandecar
 A Daughter of the Sea (1915) - Mrs.Rutland
 The Dragon (1916) - Mayme
 A Circus Romance (1916) - Zaidee
 Playing With Fire (1916) - Rosa Derblay
 The Steel Trail (1923) - Olga
 Beauty for Sale (1933) - Mrs. Gardner (uncredited)
 As Husbands Go (1934) - Emmie Sykes
 Little Man, What Now? (1934) - Mia Pinneberg
 The Party's Over (1934) - Sarah
 Servants' Entrance (1934) - Anastasia Gnu
 Wake Up and Dream (1934) - Madame Rose
 Rendezvous at Midnight (1935) - Fernande
 Eight Bells (1935) - Aunt Susan
 Age of Indiscretion (1935) - Jean Oliver
 Accent on Youth (1935) - Miss Eleanor Darling
 Millions in the Air (1935) - Mrs. Waldo-Walker
 These Three (1936) - Mrs. Lily Mortar
 The Golden Arrow (1936) - Miss Pommesby
 Poppy (1936) - Countess Maggi Tubbs DePuizzi
 The Luckiest Girl in the World (1936) - Mrs. Rosalie Duncan
 The Longest Night (1936) - Mrs. Wilson G. Wilson, a Customer
 Man of the People (1937) - Mrs. Hattie Reid
 When You're in Love (1937) - Jane Summers
 Oh, Doctor (1937) - Martha Striker
 Jim Hanvey, Detective (1937) - Adelaide Frost
 It Started with Eve (1941) - Mrs. Pennington
 Nothing But the Truth (1941) - Mrs. Van Dusen
 There's One Born Every Minute (1942) - Minerva Twine
 The Dude Goes West (1948) - Grandma Crockett
 Hollow Triumph (1948) - Mrs. Nielson - Patient (uncredited)
 Family Honeymoon (1949) - Mrs. Abercrombie
 Detective Story (1951) - Mrs. Farragut (uncredited)

References

External links

1875 births
1958 deaths
American film actresses
Actresses from Richmond, Virginia
American silent film actresses
20th-century American actresses